Henrieta Farkašová (born 3 May 1986) is a retired Slovak alpine skier, eleven-time Paralympic champion and seventeen-time world champion in the B3 (classification) category.

Biography 
Farkašová's motto is: "Impossible is nothing".

Farkašová won three gold medals at the 2010 Winter Paralympics, at Whistler Creekside in the Women's giant slalom, Women's Super combined, Women's Super-G, visually impaired and a silver medal in Women's downhill, visually impaired.

Farkašová clinched the sixth gold medal of her Paralympic career when she won the women's visually impaired downhill event during the 2018 Winter Paralympics.

In 2019 she received Laureus World Sports Award for Sportsperson of the Year with a Disability.

Farkašová skiing guide was Natália Šubrtová. Her new skiing guide is Michal Červeň.

References

External links 
 

1986 births
Living people
Slovak female alpine skiers
Paralympic alpine skiers of Slovakia
Alpine skiers at the 2010 Winter Paralympics
Alpine skiers at the 2014 Winter Paralympics
Alpine skiers at the 2018 Winter Paralympics
Alpine skiers at the 2022 Winter Paralympics
Paralympic gold medalists for Slovakia
Paralympic silver medalists for Slovakia
Medalists at the 2010 Winter Paralympics
Medalists at the 2014 Winter Paralympics
Medalists at the 2018 Winter Paralympics
Medalists at the 2022 Winter Paralympics
Paralympic medalists in alpine skiing
Laureus World Sports Awards winners
Paralympic Sport Awards — Best Female winners
People from Rožňava